XHRCL-FM is a radio station on 89.5 FM in San Luis Río Colorado, Sonora. The station is known as Variedades FM.

History
XHRCL received its concession in August 1994. It was owned by Ángel Mario Borja Navarrete. In 2000, ownership passed to Grupo ACIR. It carried its La Comadre grupera format when it was owned by ACIR.

ACIR would sell most of its Sonora stations to Radiorama, but XHRCL wound up being operated by Radio Grupo OIR, which controls almost all of the commercial radio stations in San Luis Río Colorado.

References

Radio stations in Sonora
Radio stations established in 1994
1994 establishments in Mexico